The Higgins Museum of National Bank Notes is a museum of national bank notes in Okoboji, Iowa. The museum was founded in 1978 by William R. Higgins, Jr.

Collections
The museum has collections of national bank notes from Iowa, Minnesota, and Missouri, and objects such as a bank teller cage, safes, and a spider printing press on loan from the Bureau of Engraving and Printing.

References

External links 

History museums in Iowa
Museums established in 1978
Bank museums
Museums in Dickinson County, Iowa